These are the official results of the Men's 800 metres event at the 2001 IAAF World Championships in Edmonton, Canada. There were a total number of 37 participating athletes, with five qualifying heats, two semi-finals and the final held on Tuesday 7 August 2001 at 19:50h.

André Bucher came into this race having dominated these same competitors throughout the Golden League season.  Bucher started hard but Wilfred Bungei pushed the break to take the lead past the bell in 50.41.  As they hit the backstretch, Bucher set Bungei up and passed him with 300 metres to go.  From there he just continued to pull away from Bungei, opening up over 5 metres by the finish line.  The rest of the field strung out behind William Yiampoy the last pursuer.  Paweł Czapiewski was dead last, 2 metres behind the back of the pack with 200 metres to go, still at the home straightaway, he had only passed Nils Schumann.  Sprinting down the outside of lane 2, Czapiewski ran past the field passing Yiampoy with 12 metres to go, but too much distance to get to Bungei, Czapiewski took home bronze.

Medalists

Records

Final

Semi-final
Held on Sunday 5 August 2001

Heats
Held on Tuesday 7 August 2001

References
 Finals Results
 Semi-finals results
 Heats results

H
800 metres at the World Athletics Championships